John Alexander Davis (born October 26, 1961) is an American film director, writer, animator, voice actor and composer known for his work both in stop-motion animation as well as computer animation, live action and live-action/CGI hybrids. Davis is best known for co-creating Nickelodeon's Jimmy Neutron franchise, which enjoyed popularity in the early to mid 2000s.

Early life
Davis began animating as a child using his parents' 8 mm camera to film action figures in stop motion.  His interest in animation began when he watched a stop motion film called Icharus at a film festival. He worked on the stop motion film The Bermuda Triangle in 1981 while still attending Southern Methodist University, where he graduated in 1984.

Career

K&H Productions
Soon after his graduation Davis joined the animation company K&H Productions, working with 2-D animator Keith Alcorn. Soon, Davis made the transition from claymation to 2-D animation with Alcorn's help. K&H did production work for commercials, public-access television cable TV animation, and film festivals. K&H Productions declared bankruptcy in early 1987; that same year DNA Productions was founded.

Jimmy Neutron: Boy Genius
Davis came up with the idea for Jimmy Neutron: Boy Genius (then named Johnny Quasar) sometime during the 1980s and wrote a script titled Runaway Rocketboy (later the name of the second pilot) which was later abandoned. While moving to a new house in the early 1990s he stumbled upon the script and re-worked it as a short film titled Johnny Quasar and presented it in SIGGRAPH where he met Steve Oedekerk and worked on a television series as well as the movie.

The Ant Bully

In 2006, he directed the film The Ant Bully after being approached by Tom Hanks to direct the film. Production on the film made Davis resign from production of Jimmy Neutron in January 2003. He gave his position away as Executive in charge of production to Steve Oedekerk. He also directed the movie's Video Game.

Proposed Neopets Film
Davis was set to direct an upcoming feature film based on Neopets with Warner Bros., together with producer Dylan Sellers and writer Rob Lieber. It was originally set to release on April 20, 2009, but was changed to 2011 and later changed to winter of 2012, before finally being cancelled with no other projects announced.

Nominations
In 2000, Davis was up for an Emmy along with 8 others in the category Outstanding Animated Program (For Programming More Than One Hour) for Olive, the Other Reindeer, but lost to Discovery Channel's Walking with Dinosaurs.

In 2002, Davis was nominated for an Oscar along with Steve Oedekerk in the category of Best Animated Feature for Jimmy Neutron: Boy Genius, but lost to DreamWorks Animation's Shrek.

Filmography

Internet

Astrophotography
Since about 2007, Davis has become a recognized astrophotographer, publishing high-resolution, generally wide-field images in astronomy magazines, and in NASA's Astronomy Picture of the Day.

In 2009, Davis largely founded and continues to lead APSIG, the Astrophotography Special Interest Group, associated with the Texas Astronomical Society of Dallas.

See also
 :Category:Films directed by John A. Davis

References

External links

 
 Bermuda Triangle pharosproductions.com
 DNA Productions dnahelix.com

1961 births
Living people
Animators from Texas
Film producers from Texas
American television directors
Television producers from Texas
American television writers
American male voice actors
American male screenwriters
American animated film directors
Showrunners
Southern Methodist University alumni
Place of birth missing (living people)
Astrophotographers
American male television writers
Male actors from Dallas
Film directors from Texas
Screenwriters from Texas
Nickelodeon Animation Studio people